Valero Energy Corporation is an American-based downstream petroleum company mostly involved in manufacturing and marketing transportation fuels, other petrochemical products, and power. It is headquartered in San Antonio, Texas, United States. A Fortune 500 company, before the 2013 spinoff of CST Brands, Valero was one of the United States' largest retail operators with approximately 6,800 retail and branded wholesale outlets in the United States, Canada, United Kingdom, and the Caribbean under the Valero, Diamond Shamrock, Shamrock, Beacon, and Texaco brands.

History 
Valero was created on January 1, 1980, as the successor of Coastal States Gas Corporation's Subsidiary, LoVaca Gathering Company. Valero took over the natural gas operations of the LoVaca Gathering Company, later renamed the Valero Transmission Company. The name Valero comes from Mission San Antonio de Valero, the original name of the Alamo. Valero acquired Corpus Christi Marine Services Company ("CCMS"), a small barge company in Corpus Christi, Texas in April 1981 when it purchased a stake in Saber Energy Inc. of Houston. In May 1985, Valero Refining and Marketing Company was born from Valero's subsidiary, Saber Energy, Inc.

In 1997, Valero Energy Company spun off its subsidiary, Valero, to its stockholders. At the same time, the remaining divisions, which consisted of natural gas operations, merged with a wholly owned subsidiary of Pacific Gas and Electric Company. In May of that year, the firm acquired Basis Petroleum, which left it with four refineries in Texas and Louisiana. In 1998, it then acquired a Paulsboro, New Jersey, refinery, the company's first outside of the Gulf Coast area.

In 2000, Valero purchased ExxonMobil's Benicia, California, refinery and interest in 350 Exxon-branded service stations in California, mainly in the San Francisco Bay Area. The company also began retailing gasoline under the Valero brand. In June 2001, Valero acquired the Huntway Refining Company, along with two asphalt plants on the West Coast.

On December 31, 2001, Valero completed its acquisition of Ultramar Diamond Shamrock.  The merger left Valero with over 4,700 Ultramar, Diamond Shamrock, and Beacon retail sites in the United States, Canada, and the Caribbean. With this acquisition, Valero also received ownership of Shamrock Logistics L.P., which was renamed Valero L.P.  In 2006, the division was spun off as NuStar Energy.  Starting in 2002, Valero has expanded its marketing to the East Coast, specifically the Northeast and Florida, using the Valero brand. The acquisition also includes all past Diamond Shamrock assets, including the former Sigmor Petroleum assets founded by Thomas E. Turner, founder of TETCO Inc. (the Sigmor brand name was the initials of Sigfried Moore, Turner's former employer) which merged with Shamrock Oil and Gas in 1960 forming Sigmor Shamrock - which was merged into Diamond Shamrock in 1982. Turner later repurchased Mission Petroleum Carriers when it was acquired by Diamond Shamrock which was the foundation of TETCO, and the business portfolio of the former National Convenience Stores, which was acquired by Diamond Shamrock in November 1995.

On April 25, 2005, Valero agreed to buy Premcor, Inc., for $8 billion in cash and stock to become the largest U.S. refiner, as record prices for gasoline and other fuel boosted profits. On June 30, 2005, Valero announced that it was beginning a two-year process of converting Diamond Shamrock stations to the Valero brand.  In the next year, on May 5, 2008, Valero agreed to buy 72 Albertsons gas stations.

Valero laid off 500 employees at its refinery in Delaware City, Delaware on November 20, 2009, due to profitability concerns.  It was reported the refinery had lost $1 million per day since the beginning of the year.

On March 11, 2011, Valero announced that it had agreed to a major European purchase from Chevron Corp. for $730 million in cash, not including working capital that will be determined at closing.  Estimates on the value of the working capital would place the total price at $1.73 billion.  The acquisition included Chevron's Pembroke Refinery in Wales — one of Europe's largest and most complex — together with marketing and logistical assets throughout the United Kingdom and Ireland, which include 4 pipelines, 11 terminals, an aviation fuel business, about 1,000 retail outlets, inventory and other items.

In 2013, Valero spun off its retail operations into a new publicly traded company, CST Brands. Under long-term supply agreements, Valero continues to supply fuel to over 7,400 retail locations, many of which use brand names formerly owned by Valero.

A change to the logo, store canopy and facade was announced in April 2018. Known as "Vanguard", with various hues of blue, white, and yellow, Valero explained that applying the new design to all its stores would take several months to complete.

Finances 

For the fiscal year 2017, Valero Energy reported earnings of US$4.065 billion, with an annual revenue of US$93.980 billion, an increase of 24.2% over the previous fiscal cycle. Valero Energy's shares traded at over $67 per share, and its market capitalization was valued at over US$39.2 billion in November 2018. Valero is ranked No. 31 on the Fortune 500 rankings of the largest United States corporations by total revenue as of 2018.

Environmental record
The Political Economy Research Institute ranks Valero 28th among corporations that emit airborne pollutants in the United States. The ranking is based on both the quantity (3.4 million pounds in 2005) and the toxicity of the emissions.

Valero was the biggest financial backer of the failed 2010 California Proposition 23 and contributed more than $4 million by August 2010.  Had it passed, Proposition 23 would have delayed action on greenhouse-gas emissions in the state of California by delaying current implementation of the California's Global Warming Solutions Act of 2006 until the state attained an unemployment rate of 5.5% or less for one full year. Critics argued that because that had happened only three times over the last 40 years, the proposition would have had the practical effect of repealing the law.

Valero owns two oil refineries in California. The Benicia Refinery is located on the Carquinez Strait, a tributary of the San Francisco Bay.

Valero's Wilmington (CA), Benicia (CA), and Port Arthur (TX) refineries are known to carry and process crude oil from the Amazon region of South America, a large concern for environmentalists trying to protect the Amazon rainforest. In 2015, Wilmington and Benicia processed about 13,000 and 7,200 barrels of Amazonian crude oil per day, respectively.

Carbon footprint
Valero Energy reported Total CO2e emissions (Direct + Indirect) for the twelve months ending 31 December 2020 at 27,500 Kt (-2,000 /-6.8% y-o-y).

Defense contracts
For many years, Valero Energy Corp. has been awarded contracts worth several hundred millions of dollars by the United States Defense Logistics Agency Energy (DLA Energy) through the U.S. Defense Energy Support Center (DESC) to provide fuel, often JP-8, to Israel.

Divestitures
During 2010, Valero sold its operations on the United States Atlantic coast.

In November 2009, Valero Energy closed its operations at Delaware City. Later, Valero Energy reached an agreement to sell the assets of its Delaware City Refining and Delaware Pipeline to a Petroplus Holdings subsidiary, PBF Energy Partners LP, for approximately $220 million in September 2010.

Shortly after the divestiture of Delaware City, the company sold its refinery at the Port of Paulsboro to PBF Holdings, a wholly owned subsidiary of PBF Energy, as well. The sale concluded Valero's refinery ownership on the East Coast.

Acquisitions

Through acquisitions in 2011, Valero entered the European market while strengthening its position in the United States, by reducing costs in supplying the Atlantic coast.

On August 1, 2011, Valero acquired the Pembroke Refinery from Chevron, as well as the marketing and logistics assets, for $730 million, excluding working capital, which was valued at approximately $1 billion.

Valero also purchased ownership interest in four major pipelines and eleven fuel terminals, a -per-day aviation fuel business, and a network of more than 1,000 Texaco-branded wholesale sites, which is the largest branded dealer network in the United Kingdom and the second-largest in Ireland. Valero has continued with the Texaco brand in these markets.

Retail

Valero retails gasoline branded as Valero, Shamrock, Diamond Shamrock, Beacon, and Total, the last under license from TotalEnergies. While this arm of the company was the most visible to the public, it was, according to CEO Bill Greehey, "a very small part of [Valero's] operations".

Valero attempted to shift its focus from being a discount gasoline brand to becoming a premium brand.  As part of the shift, Valero began to rebrand its Ultramar, Beacon, Total, and Diamond Shamrock stations to the Valero brand.  The Beacon and Shamrock brands are used by retailers as a low-cost alternative to the premium Valero brand. The Shamrock brand is based on the former Shamrock Oil and Gas Company, which merged with Diamond Alkali in 1967 to form Diamond Shamrock, thus declaring the trademark from official abandonment. The name Ultramar, while being eliminated in the United States, continued as Valero's brand name in Canada. Valero introduced its updated "Corner Store" retail concept on December 28, 2007, opening the company's first  prototype in western San Antonio. The Corner Store retail division, originally part of Diamond Shamrock, was absorbed into Valero's business portfolio in 2001. Not all Valero gas stations included a Corner Store - one Valero gas station in Euless, Texas east of Fort Worth is co-branded with a 7-Eleven convenience store.

Creation of CST Brands
On July 31, 2012, during the 2nd Quarter Earnings Conference Call, Valero announced intentions to separate the retail business from the remainder of the company.  CFO Mike Ciskowski stated "We believe the separation of our retail business by way of a tax-efficient distribution to our shareholders will create operational flexibility within the business and unlock value for our shareholders." In 2013, Valero completed the spinoff of the retail operations as CST Brands. Valero no longer owns retail operations using the Diamond Shamrock, Shamrock, Beacon, Ultramar, or Texaco names, but Valero continues to supply fuel.

Credit cards
Valero issues its own private label credit cards for its stations through its credit card-only subsidiary, DSRM National Bank.  The initials stand for "Diamond Shamrock Refining & Marketing", the unit of Diamond Shamrock which created it before being purchased by Valero.  The credit card operations are based in Amarillo, Texas, a city where Diamond Shamrock was once previously based.

See also

William Greehey
List of automotive fuel brands
Valero Alamo Bowl
Valero Texas Open

Notes

References

External links
 

 Valero Energy Asset Map

Companies listed on the New York Stock Exchange
American companies established in 1980
Retail companies established in 1980
Energy companies established in 1980
Non-renewable resource companies established in 1980
Oil companies of the United States
Oil pipeline companies
Companies based in San Antonio
Automotive fuel retailers
Gas stations in the United States
1980 establishments in Texas